Mary Crawford may refer to:
Mary Crawford (politician) (born 1947), Australian politician
Mary Crawford Fraser (1851–1922), née Mary Crawford, writer
Mary M. Crawford (1884–1972), American surgeon
Mary Ann Crawford, American architect
Lady Mary Lindsay Crawford, see Crawford Priory
Pseudonym of David DeCoteau

Fictional characters
Mary Crawford (Mansfield Park), a character in Jane Austen's 1814 novel, Mansfield Park
Mary Crawford, fictional character in the TV series Taken
Mary Crawford, fictional character in the film The One and Only

See also
Nora Mary Crawford (1917–1997), New Zealand policewoman